is a former Japanese football player.

Playing career
Tsurumi was born in Kofu on October 12, 1979. After graduating from University of Tsukuba, he joined his local club Ventforet Kofu in J2 League in 2002. He became a regular player as defensive midfielder under manager Takeshi Oki in first season. In 2003, he moved to J1 League club Shimizu S-Pulse with manager Oki. He played many matches in 2 seasons. However he lost opportunity to play in 2005. In April 2005, he moved to Cerezo Osaka. However he could not play many matches. In 2006, he moved to his first club, Ventforet Kofu which was promoted to J1 from 2006 season. He played as substitute center forward in 2006. However he could hardly play in the match from 2007 and Ventforet was relegated to J2. He could not play at all in the match in 2008 and retired end of 2008 season.

Club statistics

References

External links

1979 births
Living people
University of Tsukuba alumni
Association football people from Yamanashi Prefecture
Japanese footballers
J1 League players
J2 League players
Ventforet Kofu players
Shimizu S-Pulse players
Cerezo Osaka players
Association football midfielders